The following highways are numbered 802:

Costa Rica
 National Route 802

United States